Sir Nicholas Acheson 4th Baronet (c. 1655–1701) was an Irish baronet and politician.

The son of Sir George Acheson, 3rd Baronet, he succeeded to the baronetcy upon the death of his father. Between 1695 and 1699, he represented Armagh County in the Irish House of Commons. In 1695, he was appointed High Sheriff of Armagh.

He married Anne Taylor in 1676, with whom he had the following children:
Nichola Anne Acheson
Alexander Acheson (1676–1757)
Sir Arthur Acheson, 5th Baronet (1688 – 1748 or 1749)

References

thePeerage.com

1650s births
1701 deaths
Baronets in the Baronetage of Nova Scotia
High Sheriffs of Armagh
Irish MPs 1695–1699
Members of the Parliament of Ireland (pre-1801) for County Armagh constituencies